The Southern India Mills Association, often known by the acronym SIMA, is a Textile mills association established in 1956 in Coimbatore, India.

External links
 SIMA - The voice of textile mills for more than 75-years - The Hindu
 What transformed Coimbatore into The Manchester Of South India - Textile Magazine
 The Hindu
 - Business Standard

Organisations based in Coimbatore
Textile industry in Tamil Nadu
Textile industry associations
Ministry of Textiles
Trade associations based in India
Non-profit organisations based in India
1956 establishments in Madras State
Organizations established in 1956